Aelurostrongylus is a genus of nematodes belonging to the family Angiostrongylidae.

The species of this genus are found in Europe and Northern America.

Species:

Aelurostrongylus abstrusus 
Aelurostrongylus falciformis 
Aelurostrongylus pridhami

References

Nematodes